The Rutan Model 61 Long-EZ is a tandem 2-seater homebuilt aircraft designed by Burt Rutan's Rutan Aircraft Factory. The Long-EZ has a canard layout, a swept wing with wingtip rudders, and a pusher engine and propeller. The tricycle landing gear has fixed main wheels with streamlined spats and a retractable nosewheel. Its predecessor was the VariEze, plans for which were first available to homebuilders in 1976.  The prototype Long-EZ, N79RA, first flew on June 12, 1979.

Design

The Long-EZ was a scaled-up redesign of the VariEze predecessor, allowing for the use of readily available Lycoming aircraft engines instead of the Volkswagen-derived engines or hard-to-find small Continentals for which the VariEze was designed. Changes from the VariEze included a larger main wing with modified Eppler 1230 airfoil and less sweep, larger strakes containing more fuel and baggage storage, and a slightly wider cabin. The canard uses the same GU25-5(11)8 airfoil as the VariEze. Plans were offered from 1980 to 1985. There were about 700 FAA-registered Long-EZs in the United States in 2005, which had grown to 833 in 2021.

In January 1985, it was announced that plans for a new canard were being offered, to eliminate "rain trim change" that had been experienced by Long-EZ pilots. This trim change is usually a nose-down trim change experienced when flying into rain requiring a small aft force on the stick to maintain altitude, which is easily trimmed out, using the bungee trim system.  The new canard was designed with the Roncz R1145MS airfoil, which produces considerably more lift than the original GU25-5(11)8 airfoil.  This enabled the new canard to be designed with less span, reducing wetted area and thus drag. The new canard has a negligible rain trim, and rain adds only 2 knots to the stall speed.

Equipped with a rear-seat fuel tank, a Long-EZ flew for 4,800 miles (7,700 kilometers) in December 1979, still, the record for aircraft weighing less than 1000 kg.

The pilot sits in a semi-reclined seat and controls the Long-EZ using a side-stick controller situated on the right-hand console. In addition to having an airbrake on the underside, the twin tail's wing-tip rudders can be deflected outwards to act as auxiliary airbrakes.

In 1996 Burt Rutan awarded TERF Inc. the job of publishing the plans for the Long-EZ and other of his aircraft under The Rutan Aircraft Factory CD ROM Encyclopedia to further assist new builders and maintenance for existing builders. Some components for the design are supplied by Aircraft Spruce & Specialty.

In 1997, Dick Rutan and Mike Melvill flew in convoy around the world in two Rutan Long-EZ aircraft that they had built. This "around the world in 80 nights" flight was called The Spirit of EAA Friendship World Tour, and some legs of it lasted for over 14 hours.

Variants
 E-Racer
 An extensively modified redesign using Long-EZ wings with a fuselage modified for side-by-side seating, retractable landing gear, and larger automotive engine conversion powerplants.
EZ-rocket
XCOR Aerospace modified a Long-EZ and replaced the engine with twin liquid-fueled rocket engines to form a flight test vehicle called the EZ-rocket, which was used as a proof-of-concept demonstrator. Initially, a follow-on version called the "Mark-1 X-Racer, was going to be developed for the Rocket Racing League, but the Velocity SE was subsequently selected as the airframe for the Rocket Racer, rather than the Long-EZ.

Twin EZ
Ivan Shaw  built a Long-EZ and then converted it into a "Twin-EZ", an aircraft with twin wing-mounted Norton Wankel engines (precursors to the MidWest AE series). Shaw, a Yorkshireman, later designed the Europa XS kitplane.

Long ESA
A 258 hp electric engine conversion. On 19 July 2012, pilot Chip Yates achieved 202.6 mph in level flight, making the aircraft the fastest man carrying electric powered aircraft.
Berkez or Berk-EZ Heavily modified Long-EZ with Berkut 360 components.

Wright Stagger-EZ

A Steve Wright three-seater design, using standard Long-EZ wings but with a dihedral canard and a rounder, more capacious fuselage. The pilot seat is standard Long-EZ, the co-pilot seat is offset to the right and 13" rearward, and behind the pilot seat is a third seat for a passenger. The co-pilot has a control stick but no rudder pedals. Only one Stagger-EZ was built.

Long-distance EZ (G-WILY)
A standard Long-EZ modified by Bill Allen for long distance, with two wing droptanks for extra luggage and a large additional fuel tank in place of a passenger seat. Bill Allen also installed a Wilksch WAM diesel engine in one Long-EZ that he had built.

Borealis

Powered by a pulse detonation engine.  The project was developed by the Air Force Research Laboratory and Innovative Scientific Solutions, Inc.

Specifications

Accidents and incidents
By February 2023, 114 Long-Ez aircraft have been lost in accidents, with 44 fatalities. 

On February 28, 1990, Wallace Reid Jr. died after his Long-EZ crashed into the sea off Santa Monica after entering heavy fog.
Singer-songwriter and actor  John Denver died when his Long-EZ crashed on October 12, 1997, just off the coast at Pacific Grove, California. The NTSB believes that he inadvertently pushed on his right rudder pedal while twisting to the left in his seat as he struggled to operate the fuel selector valve, which on his aircraft had been moved by a previous owner to a position where it could more easily be reached from the passenger seat. Contributing factors in the Denver crash were other pilot errors, a design that led to an overly optimistic pre-flight fuel-check estimate, a known defective fuel valve that was very hard to turn, and non-standard placement of the fuel selector valve by the plane's builder, at variance with Burt Rutan's specifications. Denver was aware of the relocated valve prior to take off and had previously flown the aircraft only for approximately thirty minutes in an orientation flight the day before the accident, although he was an experienced pilot. The NTSB cited Denver's unfamiliarity with the aircraft and his failure to have the aircraft refueled as causal factors in the accident. The aerodynamics of this unusual aircraft did not play a role in Denver's crash.
On December 20, 1997, the author James Gleick crash-landed his Long-EZ at Greenwood Lake Airport in West Milford, New Jersey. The pilot was on final approach when the engine lost power and landed short of the runway against rising terrain. Probable causes of this accident were deemed to be terrain conditions and the failure of the pilot to use carburetor heat, which resulted in carburetor ice. The pilot was seriously injured and the passenger, his young son, was killed.

See also

References

External links

Homebuilt aircraft
Long-EZ
Canard aircraft
Single-engined pusher aircraft
Aircraft first flown in 1979
Mid-wing aircraft
1970s United States sport aircraft